Kotkin is a surname. Notable people with the surname include:

David Copperfield (born in 1956 as David Seth Kotkin), American magician
Joel Kotkin (born 1952), American demographer
Sergey Kotkin (born 1956), Russian politician
Stephen Kotkin (born 1959), American historian, academic, and author

See also
Kotin